Trupanea isolata is a species of tephritid or fruit flies in the genus Trupanea of the family Tephritidae.

Distribution
Vietnam.

References

Tephritinae
Insects described in 1973
Diptera of Asia